Maldevta is a village in Raipur block in the district of Dehradun, Dehradun district, Uttarakhand.

Geography 

Maldevta is located at 30.3199264 Latitude and 78.103986 longitude. It has an average elevation of 648 metres.

Schools and Colleges 

 Government Post Graduate College
 Government Intermediate College

Demography  
As of the 2000 India census, Maldevta had a population of 32437.

References 

Geography of Uttarakhand